The 1941–42 season was Real Madrid Club de Fútbol's 39th season in existence and the club's 10th consecutive season in the top flight of Spanish football.

Summary
With superb performances of forward Manuel Alday, the club finished the league season as runners-up, seven points below champions Valencia CF. Surprisingly, the squad lost at home against Celta, which shattered its options of clinching the league title. In the Copa del Generalísimo, Madrid reached the quarter-finals, where they lost to Club Atlético de Bilbao in a playoff match after a 3–3 aggregate tie.

Squad

Transfers

Competitions

La Liga

Position by round

League table

Matches

Copa del Generalísimo

Statistics

Squad statistics

Players statistics

References

Real Madrid CF seasons
Real Madrid CF